The Maryland Industrial and Agricultural Institute for Colored Youths was a school in North Laurel, Maryland, United States founded in 1901 by Ernest Lyon for the education of African-American students in central Maryland.

History 
In 1901 Ernest Lyon, the pastor at John Wesley Church in Baltimore, Maryland and a professor at Morgan College, purchased  of land located near the city of Laurel, Maryland and the Patuxent River for the establishment of a school dedicated to the education of African-American students, and served as the institution's first president, with agriculturalist R.J. Pollard as principal. Lyon was inspired by Booker T. Washington's advocacy of industrial education for African American children, and Washington later wrote in support of the Maryland Industrial and Agricultural Institute and similar institutions to the Maryland State Commission of Education. Pollard described the aims of the mission of the institute's founders as "the establishment of a Hampton or Tuskegee in Maryland-in the Black Belt of Maryland-as we have styled it."

The school was also known as the "Laurel Colored Agricultural and Industrial School."

The school merged with Bowie Normal School.

In January 2010, the Laurel Historical Society gave a lecture about the school, describing the event as "unraveling one of Laurel's great mysteries".

Funding and curriculum  
Although the Industrial and Agricultural Institute initially had difficulty securing adequate funding from the Maryland State Legislature to support its operation and relied largely on private funding, by 1909 it was one of a number of industrial schools for African-American youths that were commended by the Maryland State Commission of Education as a model of industrial education. All students received instruction in English, as well as in one of more of the following subject areas: "carpentry, mechanical drawing, farming, cookery, dressmaking, laundering and housekeeping." Students cultivated crops on the school's farmland which were used to feed school attendees and staff as well as livestock cared for by the students. The initial class consisted of eight students, who boarded on campus.

References 

 

Schools in Howard County, Maryland
Educational institutions established in 1901
African-American history of Howard County, Maryland
Buildings and structures in Laurel, Maryland
Defunct schools in Maryland
Historically segregated African-American schools in Maryland
Historically black schools
Industrial history of Maryland
Agriculture in Maryland
Bowie State University
1901 establishments in Maryland